Gloria Singleton Butler (born December 25, 1941) is an American politician from the state of Georgia. A member of the Democratic Party, Butler has been a member of the Georgia State Senate since 1999. She represents the 55th district, which encompasses parts of DeKalb County and Gwinnett County. Butler has served as Minority Leader since January 2021.

Early life and education
Gloria S. Butler graduated from Perimeter College with an associate degree in business administration. She is a member of the National Council of Negro Women, DeKalb Women's Political Caucus, National Women's Political Caucus (governing member), and the DeKalb County NAACP (lifetime member).

Political career
Butler was elected in 1998 and sworn into the Senate in 1999. She is an eight-term Senator and sits on the Senate Ethics, Health and Human Services, Public Safety, Rules, State and Local Governmental Operations, and Urban Affairs committees.

On November 16, 2020, Butler was elected Senate Minority Leader, becoming the first woman to lead a party caucus in the Senate chamber; Butler is also the second woman to lead a party caucus in either chamber after Stacey Abrams, who led the House Democratic minority from 2011 to 2017.

See also

 List of state government committees (Georgia)

References

External links
 Profile at the Georgia State Senate

1941 births
2020 United States presidential electors
20th-century American politicians
20th-century American women politicians
21st-century American politicians
21st-century American women politicians
Democratic Party Georgia (U.S. state) state senators
Living people
People from Stone Mountain, Georgia
Perimeter College at Georgia State University alumni
Women state legislators in Georgia (U.S. state)